Monoblastus is a genus of parasitoid wasps belonging to the family Ichneumonidae.

The species of this genus are found in Europe, Southeastern Asia and Northern America.

Species:
 Monoblastus apicalis Townes, 1992 
 Monoblastus atroferia Townes & Townes, 1950

References

Ichneumonidae
Ichneumonidae genera